Ghadir Ghrouf (born September 12, 1990 in Jericho) is a track and field sprint athlete who competes internationally for Palestine.

Ghrouf represented Palestine at the 2008 Summer Olympics in Beijing. She competed at the 100 metres sprint and placed seventh in her heat without advancing to the second round. She ran the distance in a time of 13.07 seconds.

She was born handicapped with a deformation of the ankles which made it difficult for her to walk; this was not corrected until she was ten years old. Soon thereafter, she took an interest in sprinting, and began regular training. Between 2003 and 2007, she became Palestine's national champion for her age category in the women's 100m, 200m and 400m sprints. In 2006, she was the youngest competitor at the indoor athletics championships in Moscow.

She is of distant African immigrant descent.

References

1990 births
Living people
People from Jericho
Palestinian female sprinters
Olympic athletes of Palestine
Athletes (track and field) at the 2008 Summer Olympics